Collegeville may refer to some places in the United States:

Collegeville, Alabama
Collegeville, Indiana
Collegeville Township, Minnesota
Collegeville, Pennsylvania

Collegeville may refer to some places in Canada:

Collegeville, Nova Scotia